Groulx is a surname. Notable people with the surname include:

Benoit Groulx (Canadian football)
Benoit Groulx (ice hockey)
Benoit-Olivier Groulx, hockey player
Danny Groulx, hockey player
Danny Groulx (Canadian football)
Georges Groulx, actor
Gilles Groulx, filmmaker
Henri Groulx, politician
Joseph Groulx, storyteller
Lionel Groulx, historian 
Collège Lionel-Groulx, a college
Lionel-Groulx station, a station on the Montreal Metro
Pierre Groulx, hockey coach
Sébastien Groulx, weightlifter
Sylvie Groulx, filmmaker
Teddy Groulx, hockey player
Wayne Groulx, hockey player
Will Groulx, wheelchair rugby player

See also
Monts Groulx, a range of hills
Groulx, an electoral district